Sherrill or Sherrills may refer to:

Places
In the United States:
 Sherrill, Arkansas, in Jefferson County
 Sherrill, Iowa, in Dubuque County
 Sherrill, Missouri 
 Sherrill, New York, in Oneida County; the smallest city in New York
 Sherrills Ford, NC, a small town in Catawba County
 Sherrill, Texas Austin, TX 
 Sherrill, Oklahoma Lawton, OK
 Sherrill, Arizona

People

Given name: male 

 Sherrill Busby (1914–1960), American football player
 Sherrill David Robinson (1922–2011), American comic book artist known as Jerry Robinson
 Sherrill Halbert (1901–1991), American judge
 Sherrill Headrick (1937–2008), American professional football player
 Sherrill Milnes (born 1935), American dramatic baritone
 Sherrill Roland (born 1984), African-American artist
 Sherril Schell (1877–1964), American architectural and portrait photographer working in London
 Sherrill W. Ward (1911–1984), American Thoroughbred racehorse trainer

Given name: female 

 Sherrill Cheda (1936–2008), American-Canadian librarian, feminist writer and arts administrator
 Sherrill Elizabeth Tekatsitsiakawa Katsi Cook (born 1952), Mohawk Native American midwife, environmentalist, Native American rights activist, and women's health advocate known as Katsi Cook
 Sherrill Kester (born 1978), American soccer player
 Sherrill Levitt, American woman missing since 1992

Surname 
Sherrill (surname)

See also
City of Sherrill v. Oneida Indian Nation of N. Y. (2005), a U.S. Supreme Court case
 Sherrill Manufacturing
Sheryl
Cheryl